Slatina is a small dispersed settlement in the western Slovene Hills in the Municipality of Kungota in northeastern Slovenia, right on the border with Austria.

References

External links
Slatina on Geopedia

Populated places in the Municipality of Kungota